ReDNA is an abbreviation referring to:
 Recombinant DNA
 Recognition element DNA
 Reporter DNA

DNA